Lynch Hunt (born November 23, 1975) is an author and prison reform activist. His book Prison to Prosperity (2019) was the basis and inspiration for US H.R. 4369, the proposed Prison to Prosperity Act,  introduced by Rep. Mark Walker.

Early life 
Lynch Hunt was born in Riverhead, New York and grew up in Beverly, New Jersey, one of three children raised by his mother. He attended Palmyra High School in Palmyra, New Jersey, and Upsala College in East Orange, New Jersey.

Arrest 
On September 20, 2003, he was arrested for conspiracy to distribute cocaine and crack cocaine. He was subsequently convicted and served ten years in prison. He was released on July 12, 2012.

Personal life 
Lynch Hunt married Wendy Hunt on March 23, 2012. He has one biological daughter and two stepdaughters. He currently lives in Greensboro, North Carolina, where he runs a gym, AWOL Fitness.

Books 

7 Levels of Discipline that Manifest Success (2016)

Accelerate Your Resultz Affirmation Cards (2018)

Prison to Prosperity (2019)

5 Psychological Disciplines Affirmation Cards (2020)

Kids Affirmation Cards (2020)

30 Day Road map Affirmation Cards (2020)

AWOL Nutrition Guide (2020)

Other work 
Lynch is the resident health and wellness expert for the WFMY2 Good Morning Show, hosting a weekly segment called "Motivation Mondays".

References

21st-century American writers
American health and wellness writers
1975 births
Living people
American convicts who became writers